The men's 200 metres event at the 2010 Asian Games was held at the Aoti Main Stadium, Guangzhou, China on 24–25 November.

Schedule
All times are China Standard Time (UTC+08:00)

Records

Results
Legend
DNS — Did not start

Round 1
 Qualification: First 2 in each heat (Q) and the next 2 fastest (q) advance to the final.

Heat 1 
 Wind: +0.6 m/s

Heat 2 
 Wind: +1.0 m/s

Heat 3 
 Wind: +0.5 m/s

Final 
 Wind: +1.4 m/s

 Suresh Sathya of India originally finished 6th, but was later disqualified after IAAF announced that he had tested positive for Nandrolone prior to the Asian Games.

References

Results

Athletics at the 2010 Asian Games
2010